Walter C. Boetcher (November 13, 1881 – October 5, 1951) was 32nd mayor of the city of Indianapolis, Indiana. He served as mayor from 1937 to 1939. He was a member of the Democratic Party. Boetcher is buried at Crown Hill Cemetery in Indianapolis.

References 

1881 births
1951 deaths
Burials at Crown Hill Cemetery
Mayors of Indianapolis
Indiana Democrats
20th-century American politicians